Eileen Burns (born 17 February 1989) is an Irish female track cyclist, representing Ireland at international competitions. She competed at the 2016 UEC European Track Championships in the individual pursuit event and team pursuit event.

Career results
2016
Dublin Track Cycling International
1st Individual Pursuit

References

1989 births
Living people
Irish female cyclists
Irish track cyclists
Place of birth missing (living people)
21st-century Irish women